Centrolene daidalea (common name: Alban Cochran frog) is a species of frog in the family Centrolenidae. It is known from Colombia and Venezuela.

Centrolene daidalea inhabits vegetation near streams in premontane and cloud forests. It has also been recorded from secondary forests. It is threatened by habitat loss and fragmentation.

References

daidalea
Amphibians of Colombia
Amphibians of Venezuela
Taxonomy articles created by Polbot
Amphibians described in 1991